Poley may refer to:

People
 Thomas Poley (died c. 1563), Tudor-era English politician
 Edmund Poley (1544–1613), English politician
 Robert Poley (fl. 1568– aft. 1602), English double agent
 Robert Poley (English MP), (c.1600-1627) English politician
 Sir Edmund Poley (1619–1671), English politician
 Ted Poley (born 1964), American rock singer and drummer

Places
 Poley, Germany, a municipality in Saxony-Anhalt, Germany
 Poley, Louisiana, U.S.
 Poley Mountain, New Brunswick, Canada
 Aguilar de la Frontera, Andalucia, Spain, called Poley during the Moorish suzerainty

See also
 Polis, plural poleis (sometimes pronounced poley), the Greek word for city state